Eni Vasili  is an Albanian journalist, writer, former news reporter and host of the TV talk show Open, which airs two times a week in the national television Top Channel.

Career 
Vasili graduated in communication at IULM University in Italy. She started her career in 1997 at a very young age as journalist in news department of RTSH.  From 2005 to 2011 she hosted political TV-show 'Studio e Hapur' in 'Alsat', later 'Albanian Screen'. In 2013 she joined 'News 24' with 'Studio e Hapur'.  In September 2018, Eni Vasili moved to Top Channel, rebranding her show as Open, which airs on Mondays and Thursdays at 21:00 and has quickly gained audience's attention becoming one of the most watched political talk shows.

Vasili is also author of two books, 'Unë kam vrarë'  and 'Zëra nga errësira'.

Career in television
Eni Vasili started her career in journalism as news anchor and journalist of public broadcaster's informative department in 1997, during tensed political circumstances in Albania. In 2005, she started her talk show 'Studio e Hapur' in Alsat television where she also served as Director of news department. Vasili left Alsat, rebranded later as Albanian Screen television in 2011 due to financial problems of this television that was closed later. In 2013, Eni joined News 24 television by hosting television's main political TV-show with the unchanged name, 'Studio e Hapur'. In September 2018, after weeks of negotiations during summer, Vasili moved to Top Channel, replacing Ylli Rakipi and his show 'Të paekspozuarit' who joined Top Channel after Sokol Balla left Top Channel in January 2018.

Eni Vasili's talk-show 'Open' quickly became one of the most watched programmes in the country, as direct rival of Blendi Fevziu's talk show due to its focus on actuality topics and Top Channel's decision to be 'open to all' as the slogan of the talk-show says.

References 

People from Tirana
Albanian journalists
21st-century Albanian women writers
Albanian television presenters
Year of birth missing (living people)
Living people
Albanian women journalists
20th-century journalists
21st-century journalists
IULM University of Milan alumni